Balzac is a crater on Mercury.  Its name was adopted by the International Astronomical Union in 1976. Balzac is named for the French writer Honoré de Balzac, who lived from 1799 to 1850.

Balzac is one of the largest craters of the Kuiperian system on Mercury. The largest is Bartók crater.

Hollows are present within Balzac.

Views

References

Impact craters on Mercury